Jiugong may refer to:
Jiugong, an area in northern Daxing District, Beijing
Jiugong Station, a subway station on the Yizhuang Line of the Beijing Subway
Jiugong Mountains, a mountain range in Hubei